The Visitation may refer to:

The Visitation (Christianity),  a Christian feast day commemorating the visit of the Blessed Virgin Mary with Saint Elizabeth as recorded in the Gospel of Luke 1:39–56
The Visitation (Doctor Who), a 1982 serial in the British science fiction television series Doctor Who
The Visitation (novel), a 1999 novel by Frank Peretti
The Visitation (film), a 2006 film based on the Peretti novel
The Visitation (Chrome album) (1976)
The Visitation (Magnum album) (2011)
The Visitation (MS), a Hungarian painting by "Master MS"

See also
 Visitation (disambiguation)